Tahar Zoughari Stadium is a multi-use stadium in Relizane, Algeria.  It is  mostly for football matches.  The stadium holds 30,000 people. RC Relizane are tenants.
The stadium was opened on 18 March 1987.

References

Tahar Zoughari
Buildings and structures in Relizane Province